Svenska Supercupen 2012, Swedish Super Cup 2012, was the 6th Svenska Supercupen, an annual football match contested by the winners of the previous season's Allsvenskan and Svenska Cupen competitions. The match was played at Olympia, Helsingborg, on 24 March 2012, and was contested by league winners Helsingborgs IF and runners-up AIK. AIK qualified for the cup as Allsvenskan runners-up since Helsingborg won both the league and Svenska Cupen in 2011. The match was Helsingborgs third appearance and AIKs second in Svenska Supercupen since its creation. Olympia hosted the final for the first time and the two clubs played against each other for the first time in the cup's history.

The match was broadcast live on TV4 Sport, a channel belonging to the TV4 Group. FIFA listed Markus Strömbergsson from Gävle was the referee for the match for the third consecutive time. Helsingborg won the match 2–0 after two goals from Dutch midfielder Rachid Bouaouzan. This was Helsingborgs second consecutive title in the competition and fifth consecutive title in Swedish football.

Match facts

MATCH OFFICIALS
Assistant referees:
Mathias Klasenius, (Örebro)
Per Brogevik (Kumla)
Fourth official: Daniel Stålhammar (Landskrona)

MATCH RULES
90 minutes.
30 minutes of extra-time if necessary.
Penalty shoot-out if scores still level.
Seven named substitutes.
Maximum of three substitutions.

See also
2011 Allsvenskan
2011 Svenska Cupen

References

External links
 

Supercupen
2012
Svenska Supercupen 2012
21st century in Skåne County
AIK Fotboll matches